The St. Joseph Cathedral Also Temuco Cathedral is a building of the Catholic church located in the city of Temuco in Chile. This cathedral is one of the newest ecclesiastical constructions in Chile. From modern lines the new building replaced the old Cathedral collapsed in the earthquake of 1960. The first stone of the new building was placed on March 19, 1981, for the feast of St. Joseph. It was completed only in 1991.

The project selected corresponded to that of the architect Gerardo Rendel. Several fundraising campaigns were carried out, including the call of the square meter, the one of the windows, the ceiling and pavement, and the campaign for the pews. There were also contributions from Pope John Paul II and from some foreign Catholic churches.

See also
Roman Catholicism in Chile

References

St. Joseph Cathedral
Roman Catholic churches completed in 1991
20th-century Roman Catholic church buildings in Chile
Modernist architecture in Chile